Darius Adamczyk (born February 8, 1966) is a Polish-American businessman. He is the chairman and chief executive officer (CEO) of Honeywell, an American multinational conglomerate.

Early life and education
Adamczyk was born in Poland on February 8, 1966, and immigrated to the US at the age of 11, speaking no English. His family settled in Grand Rapids, Michigan. He went to Michigan State University to study electrical and computer engineering, where he received his bachelor's degree. He received a master's degree in computer engineering from Syracuse University, and an MBA from Harvard University.

Career
Adamczyk started his career with General Electric in 1988, as an electrical engineer. He later spent four years at Booz Allen Hamilton, a consulting firm, followed by positions at Ingersoll-Rand PLC and Metrologic.

In 2008, Adamczyk was CEO of Metrologic Inc when Honeywell purchased the holding company for $720 million. After the purchase, Adamczyk joined Honeywell's executive team. He became president of Honeywell Process Solutions in 2012. After two years in this role, he then became president and CEO of Honeywell Performance Materials and Technologies in 2014. 
  
In June 2016, it was announced that David M. Cote would step down as CEO of Honeywell at the end of March 2017 and Adamczyk would succeed him. Cote continued as executive chairman through April 2018, when he stepped down and Adamczyk was elected chairman.  

Fortune Magazine reported on Adamczyk’s leadership style, "Adamczyk used a similar strategy in his various roles: apply analytical rigor to identify areas of potential growth, chop deadweight, and lean into software and automation." After assuming his post, Adamczyk ordered a comprehensive portfolio review process that included input from industry experts and stakeholders. The company announced two major divestments that represented about $7.5 billion in revenues. The company also became the first major American public company to disclose its ratio of CEO pay to median employee. Adamczyk is also noted for building on the company's Sentience platform and expanded it into Honeywell Forge, a cloud-based IoT platform and product development framework for the development of scalable software.

Awards and memberships
The Carnegie Corporation of New York honored Adamczyk with 2019 Great Immigrant Award. Adamczyk was awarded the Foreign Policy Association’s Corporate Social Responsibility Award. He is a member of The Business Roundtable, The Business Council, and Council on Foreign Relations. President Trump selected Adamczyk to join the Great American Economic Revival Industry Groups.

See also

 List of chief executive officers

References

External links
Official Honeywell page

1966 births
Living people
American chief executives of Fortune 500 companies
Honeywell people
Harvard Business School alumni
Michigan State University alumni
Syracuse University College of Engineering and Computer Science alumni
Polish emigrants to the United States